Teresa Mo Shun-kwan (born 5 November 1960) is a Hong Kong actress.

Background
She started her career at RTV in the 1977, and joined TVB in 1981. She became famous for being cast in The Justice of Life (他來自江湖), which was based on Stephen Chow's works. In 1990s she made frequent appearances in feature films.

Personal life
She is married to director Tony Au and they have two daughters, Au Yik-san (區亦山) and Au Ling-san (區令山).

Filmography

Awards and nominations

References

External links
 
 HK cinemagic entry

1960 births
TVB actors
Hong Kong film actresses
Hong Kong television actresses
Living people
20th-century Hong Kong actresses
21st-century Hong Kong actresses
Hong Kong Christians